Nic Cudd (born 12 October 1988) is a rugby union flanker. He previously played for the Dragons, Llanelli RFC and the Scarlets.

Cudd joined the Scarlets Academy in 2004, when he was 16 years old. In the summer of 2010, Cudd signed a development contract with the Scarlets to be a full-time member of their squad. In September 2012 Cudd joined the Dragons He was released by the Dragons at the end of the 2019–20 season.

References

External links
 Dragons Profile

1988 births
Living people
Dragons RFC players
Llanelli RFC players
Rugby union players from Carmarthen
Scarlets players
Welsh rugby union players
Rugby union flankers